Sello Sebotsane (born 23 October 1970), is a South African actor and producer. He is best known for the roles in the television serials such as Stokvel, Those Who Can't, Rockville and 90 Plein Street.

Personal life
Sebotsane was born on 23 October 1970 in Tshwane, South Africa. He completed a National Diploma in Speech and Drama from the Tshwane University of Technology.

He was married to fellow actress and fashion designer Shoki Sebotsane. The couple has a daughter, Oratile Kutlwano. In 2018, Shoki was strangled twice, punched several times in the face and in the body by Sello. These two separate incidents of domestic violence occurred at their Kibler Park home, south of Johannesburg. She sustained injuries to her face, stomach and legs after the assault. Later Sebotsane was charged with domestic violence and assault with intent to do grievous bodily harm. The court case was opened in 2016 at Mondeor police station in Johannesburg.

Career
In 1994, he made film debut with the role "Jim Makokela" in the film Jock: A True Tale of Friendship co-directed by Danie Joubert and Duncan MacNeillie. Since then, he acted in the films such as; Panic Mechanic, Tarzan: The Epic Adventures, Orion's Key, Ernest Goes to Africa, Tarzan and the Lost City and CI5: The New Professionals.

In 2006, he made a recurring role as "Jacob" in the SABC3 drama series One Way where he appeared in two episodes. Then in 2007, he joined with the SABC2 Afrikaans serial Andries Plak. In 2006, he played the role "Philane" in the SABC2 sitcom Stokvel. The role became very popular and he continued to play the role until 2012 eighth season. In 2012, he appeared in the SABC3 comedy Those Who Can't with the role "Principal Ezekiel Dlamini", where he continued in the second season as well. In the same year, he played the role "Thabo Kekana" in the SABC2 drama Erfsondes and reprised the role in the second season. In 2008, he acted in the M-Net comedy series Van der Walt's Fault with the lead role of "Progress".

While playing in the serial Stokvel, he played the role "Bhekumuzinsizwe "The General" Letswalo" in another SABC2 sitcom Home Sweet Home in 2011. Then he appeared in the SABC2 parliamentary drama series 90 Plein Street and played the role "George Motha". In 2013, he joined with the cast of Mzansi Magic drama serial "Rockville" where he played the role "Pastor Morake" for four consecutive years until 2016. Then in 2016, he appeared in the second and third seasons of another Mzansi Magic drama serial Saints and Sinners with the role "Sbu Khumalo". Apart from those notable roles, he also appeared in many televisions serials and soapies with supportive and minor roles, including The No. 1 Ladies' Detective Agency, CI5: The New Professionals, Isidingo, Backstage, Scoop Schoombie, SOS, Madam and Eve, Hidden City, Egoli and Safe.

Apart from cinema and television, he performed in many theatre productions after joined with renowned theatre companies such as; Johannesburg Civic Theatre, Grahamstown Arts Festival and Market Theatre. His notable theatre plays are Scribble, Happy Natives, Cold Stone Jug, Sophiatown, Gugi Mzimba: The Spirit of Gerald Sekoto, The Mountaintop and The Amen Corner. For his role in the play Happy Natives, he received the Naledi Theatre Award for Best Supporting Actor.

Filmography

References

External links
 IMDb

1970 births
Living people
South African male film actors
South African male television actors
South African male stage actors